"Searchin" is a 1993 song by the musician CeCe Peniston, taken from her second solo album Thought 'Ya Knew on A&M Records.

However, the single was released only as a promotional release in United Kingdom, which included three remixes by Jamie Principle (of which two were later available on D-side of the exclusively UK limited edition of Thought 'Ya Knew), the song was later available on B-side of the singer's single "I'm Not Over You" that scored in the US Dance chart at number two, as well as at number seven in the US R&B chart.

Credits and personnel
 CeCe Peniston - lead vocal, back vocal, executive producer
 Steve Hurley - writer, remix, arranger, producer, additional producer
 Tonia Hurley - writer
 Marc Williams - writer
 Jamie Principle - remix
 Sharon Pass - back vocal
 Chantay Savage - back vocal
 Scott Ahaus - engineer, remix engineer
 Steve Veeder - engineer
 Manny Lehman - executive producer
 Damon Jones - executive producer
 Silk Productions & River North Recording, Chicago, Illinois - recording studio, mix
 Last Song (ASCAP) - publisher
 Third Coast Music - admin

Track listings
 12", EU, Promo, #AMXDJ455
 "Searchin'" (Silk In The House Mix) - 6:27
 "Searchin'" (Principle Theory Mix) - 5:31
 "Searchin'" (Silky Fusion Mix) - 7:13

References

General

 Specific

External links 
 

1993 singles
CeCe Peniston songs
Songs written by Steve "Silk" Hurley
1993 songs
A&M Records singles
Songs written by M-Doc